The 2022 LCK season was the eleventh season of South Korea's LCK, a professional esports league for the MOBA PC game League of Legends.

The regular season format was double round robin. The games were played five days per week for both round robins.

The spring split began on 12 January and finished on 20 March, immediately followed by the spring playoffs, which concluded with the spring finals, where T1 defeated Gen.G with a match score of 3–1 on 2 April. T1 represented the LCK in the 2022 Mid-Season Invitational, losing out to defending champions Royal Never Give Up 3–2 in the finals.

Broadcasting
The LCK was broadcast at the following platforms:
 Korean: Naver, Afreeca TV, Twitch
 English: Twitch
 Chinese: HuyaTV
 French: OTP
 Vietnam: YouTube

Spring

Regular season

Playoffs

Awards

Summer

Regular season

Playoffs

Awards

References

League of Legends
Sports leagues in South Korea
2022 multiplayer online battle arena tournaments
League of Legends Champions Korea seasons